Dorian Leon Marlois Le Gallienne (19 April 1915 – 27 July 1963) was an Australian composer, teacher and music critic.

Biography
Dorian Le Gallienne was born in Melbourne in 1915.  His father, an actor, was born in France, and his mother, a pianist who had studied with G. W. L. Marshall-Hall, was the daughter of the Assistant Astronomer at the Melbourne Observatory.  His parents separated in 1924, and his father lived in England thereafter.  He attended Melbourne Church of England Grammar School.  He was diagnosed with diabetes at age 16.  After leaving school, he studied with A. E. H. Nickson at the Melbourne Conservatorium and with Arthur Benjamin and Herbert Howells at the Royal College of Music in London in 1938.  In 1939, he travelled in Europe with Richard Downing, a future Chairman of the Australian Broadcasting Commission (ABC), and with whom he later lived in Melbourne in a mud-brick house at Eltham.

He returned to Australia, where he worked for the Commonwealth Department of Information in the overseas broadcasting service, later joining the ABC.  He was employed as music critic for The Argus and The Age, both Melbourne newspapers, from 1950 until his death.  In an article called "Why Preference for 'Celebrities'?", he criticised the ABC for its lack of support for local music and musicians in its "Celebrity" subscription concerts.  From 1951 to 1953 he undertook further study with Gordon Jacob in England.  He taught harmony at the University of Melbourne Conservatorium between 1954 and 1960.

His best known work, the Sinfonietta, was written between 1951 and 1956, and was interrupted by the writing of his only completed Symphony (1953).  The Sinfonietta is of 12 minutes duration and shows the influence of Shostakovich, Hindemith, Prokofiev and Vaughan Williams.  The first two movements were written in Britain, the remainder some years later in Australia.  The Symphony was premiered in 1955, the Sinfonietta in 1956.  In 1967 the music critic Roger Covell wrote that Le Gallienne's Symphony was 'still the most accomplished and purposive ... written by an Australian'.  Rhoderick McNeill has more recently opined that the Symphony is only eclipsed by Robert Hughes's Symphony as the finest Australian symphony of the period.  However, it is little known since the score has never been published and the work has never been commercially recorded (although it can be heard at the Australian Music Centre in Sydney).

Another especially significant work of Le Gallienne is his song-cycle, Four Holy Sonnets of John Donne, for low voice and piano.  He also wrote music for Tim Burstall's film The Prize (1960), which won a bronze medal at the Venice Film Festival, and worked with Burstall on two other films.

He died of diabetes-induced heart disease in 1963, and was buried in the Eltham cemetery next to the artists' colony Montsalvat.  A second symphony remained incomplete at the time of his death.

The Dorian Le Gallienne Award was founded to commemorate his life in music, and is awarded every two years to a composer resident in Victoria. The first award, in 1965, was to Helen Gifford.

Works
 Contes heraldiques, or The sleepy princess (ballet, 1947)
 Beloved, let us love one another
Blue Wrens (piano)
 The Cactus of the Moon
 Duo (violin and viola; 1956)
 Fanfare
 Farewell! Thou art too dear for my possessing
 Fear no more the heat o' the sun
 Four divine poems of John Donne (1950)
 Four nursery rhymes
 Go, heart (words by James Wedderburn)
 How oft when thou, my music (Shakespeare, sonnet no. 128)
 I had a little nut-tree
 Incidental music to Macbeth (piano)
 Incidental music to Othello (oboe and guitar)
 Jinker ride (piano, with Robert Hughes)
 Legend (2 pianos)
 Most blessed of mornings (short introit for SATB a cappella choir)
 Nocturne (piano)
 No longer mourn for me (Shakespeare, sonnet no. 71)
 O rose, thou art sick (SSATB a cappella choir)
 Overture in E flat (1952)
 Peta White; Grey goose and gander (two traditional songs)
 The Rivals (piano)
 Sinfonietta (1956)
 Solveig's cradle song (from Ibsen's Peer Gynt)
 Sonata (flute and piano; 1943)
 Sonata (piano; recorded by Trevor Barnard)
 Sonata (violin and piano; 1945)
 Sonatina in E minor for piano duet (1941)
 Symphonic study (piano, 1940?)
 Symphony in E (1953)
 There was a king
 Three piano pieces
 Three psalms (SATB choir and organ)
 Trio for oboe, violin and viola (1957)
 Voyageur, ballet (1954)

See also
 French Australians

References

Sources
 Australian Music Centre
 Australian Dictionary of Biography
 Music Australia
 ABC Classic FM
 Music Australia

1915 births
1963 deaths
Musicians from Melbourne
Australian film score composers
Male film score composers
20th-century classical composers
Australian music educators
Australian people of French descent
Alumni of the Royal Academy of Music
Academic staff of the University of Melbourne
Australian music critics
Australian women music critics
20th-century Australian musicians
20th-century Australian male musicians
Australian classical composers